Carpathian Half-Brigade of National Defence was a unit of the Polish Army in the interbellum period that took part in the Polish September Campaign. It was formed in July 1937 in Stanisławów. Originally, it consisted of two battalions, but in May 1939 it was expanded to four battalions. In the summer of 1939 it became part of the Karpaty Army. Its battalions were:
 Battalion Stryj,
 Battalion Stanislawow,
 Battalion Huculski I,
 Battalion Huculski II.

Sources 
September Campaign, Karpaty Army
 Brigades of National Defence

See also
 Polish army order of battle in 1939
 Polish September Campaign

Infantry brigades of Poland
Invasion of Poland
Polish Land Forces
Military units and formations established in 1937